Yanaqucha (Quechua yana black, qucha lake, "black lake", Hispanicized spelling Yanacocha) is a  mountain in the eastern extensions of the Willkapampa mountain range in the Andes of Peru at a little lake of that name. It is located in the Cusco Region, Anta Province, on the border of the districts of Ancahuasi and Huarocondo. The mountain and the lake lie southeast of Muyuq.

References

Mountains of Peru
Mountains of Cusco Region
Lakes of Peru
Lakes of Cusco Region